Abū 'Alī al-Fārisī; surnamed Abū Alī al Ḥasan Aḥmad Abd al-Ghaffār Ibn Muḥammad ibn Sulaimān ibn Abān al-Fārisī (c. 901 – 987) ; was a leading grammarian of the school of al-Baṣrah of mixed Arab and Iranian heritage. He lived in Baghdād and later served at the courts of Sayf al-Dawla at Aleppo and 'Aḍud al-Dawlah at Shiraz. His nephew was Abi al-Hussein Muhammad Bin al-Hassan Bin Abd al-Wareth al-Faressi al-Nawawi, who instructed the celebrated theorist al-Jurjānī on al-Fārisī's grammatical treatise, the Idah.

Life

Abū 'Ali al-Ḥasan ibn Ahmad ibn al-Ghaffār al-Fārisī, was known as Abū Alī, or sometimes al-Fasawī. He was born in the town of Fasa in Fars province in 901. He was born to a Persian father and an Arab mother. In 919, he went to Baghdād to study. He travelled widely and spent a period with Sayf ad-Dawlah ibn Hamdān, the Hamdanid ruler at Aleppo in 952/953, where he held conferences with the famous court poet al-Mutanabbi (915-965). He continued on to Fars, and gained favour at the Buyid court of 'Aḍud al-Dawlah ibn Buwaih in Shirāz.

Ibn Khallikan recounts a grammatical contest at the hippodrome, ('Maidān') between Abū Alī and the prince 'Aḍud al-Dawlah, on a finer point of grammar over the use of the accusative case. In the expression:

 The prince argued that 'Zaid' should be in the nominative and not in the accusative case.  When Abū Alī maintained that the verb is understood in the ellipse and therefore 'Zaid' is governed by the accusative, the prince challenged: "Why not use the nominative to fill the ellipse as: Abū Alī conceded he was stumped by this remark saying; 
 
However 'Aḍud is reported to have said:

Abū Alī dedicated his grammatical works, the Idāh (illustration) and Takmila (supplement), to 'Aḍud and composed a treatise on the subject of his debate with the prince which contained 'Aḍud ad-Dawlah's approbation. In his Idāh, he mentions that the exception is governed in the accusative by the verb which precedes (i.e. by the verb 'came'), in consequence of its corroboration by the word except. Ibn Khallikān relates another anecdote about a conversation between the poet Abū 'l-Qāsim ibn Aḥmad al-Andalusī and Abū Alī. The grammarian had expressed envy of Abū 'l-Qāsim's genius in poetry and admitted to his own lack, despite, as a grammarian, having expertise in the scientific basis of poetry. He claimed then he had only ever composed three verses which run:

'Aḍud ad-Dawlat was fond of repeating a quote by Abū Tammām, given in Abū Alī's treatise Idāh to explain the rule about the verb,'to be': 

Ibn Khallikān relates a dream he had while in Cairo that he met three pilgrims in an ancient funeral chapel  in the village of Kalyūb. One pilgrim mentioned that the sheikh Abū Alī 'l-Fārisī had lived there for many years; and that he had been a talented poet among other things. Ibn Khallikān had never came across any of his poetry.  So in a sweet voice the man recited three verses. When he awoke the charming voice was still in his ears, but he could only recall this, the last verse:
He was suspected of being a Mutazilite.
He died at Baghdād on Sunday the 17th of Rabi' al-thani (some say Rabi' al-awwal) 377 h. (Aug 987) He was interred in the cemetery of "Shūnīzi".

Works
Idāh; 'Illustration' and Takmila (supplement); grammatical works;
 Kitāb al-masā'il al-maslahat yurwiha 'an az-Zajjāj wa-tu'raf bi-al-Aghfāl; the Aghfāl (negligences), or 'Beneficial (Corrected) Questions', in which he refutes al-Zajjāj in his Maāni (rhetoric); 
 Kitāb ḥujja; (Proof) Argument That the Seven Readers Were the Imams of the Cities, as Designated by Abū Bakr Aḥmad ibn Mūsā ibn al-'Abbās ibn Mujāhid; 
 Kitāb taḍkira; The Recollection (Remembrance), a large volume;
 Kitāb mukhtaṣir 'awāmil al'a'rāb; Elucidation in Grammar;
Kitāb abyāt al-a'rāb; Verses (Tents) of the Arabians;
Digest of Governing Words in Declension (Conjugation);
Questions discussed in al-Baghdādī; al-Ḥalabī; al-Shirāzī and al-Baṣrah 
Treatise on the short and long Alif;
The Hundred Agents (or governing parts of speech);  
Questions discussed at Conferences, etc.

Notes

References

Bibliography

External links

900s births
987 deaths
Year of birth uncertain
10th-century Muslim scholars of Islam
10th-century scholars
10th-century philologists
10th-century Arabic writers
10th-century linguists
10th-century Iranian writers
Scholars from the Abbasid Caliphate
Iranian Arabists
Scholars under the Buyid dynasty
Grammarians of Arabic
Grammarians of Basra
Medieval grammarians of Arabic
Iranian grammarians
Linguists from Iran
People from Fasa
People from the Hamdanid emirate of Aleppo
Iranian people of Arab descent
Sayf al-Dawla